Royalty Free: The Music of Kevin MacLeod is a 2020 American documentary film about the composer Kevin MacLeod. The film documents the life of Kevin MacLeod and how he became one of the most heard composers in the world, with his work ending up in millions of videos and thousands of films. The film deals with the digital audio revolution and the question of its relationship to technological unemployment.

The film premiered at the Julien Dubuque International Film Festival on October 17, 2020. The film was acquired by First Run Features and was released on March 29, 2022.

Reception

Critical response 
On the review aggregator Rotten Tomatoes, the film has an 89% Fresh score and positive reviews from critics.

Awards and nominations 
 Best New England Feature Documentary, 2021 Shawna Shea Film Festival
 Best Documentary Feature Nominee, 2021 Beloit International Film Festival

References

External links 
 
 
 

2020s biographical films
2020 documentary films
2020 films
2020 independent films
American biographical films
American documentary films
American independent films
Films set in Wisconsin
Films shot in Wisconsin
Documentary films about the Internet
Documentary films about the music industry
Documentary films about technology
2020s English-language films
2020s American films